The 361st Expeditionary Reconnaissance Squadron is an inactive United States Air Force unit.  Its last was assigned to the 451st Air Expeditionary Group, stationed at Kandahar Airfield, Afghanistan.  It was inactivated on 1 September 2014.

The squadron's first predecessor was the 861st Bombardment Squadron, a United States Army Air Forces unit that was assigned to the 493d Bombardment Group during World War II.  It was part of the last bombardment group to be assigned to Eighth Air Force.  It flew combat missions until V-E Day, then returned to the United States for inactivation.

The squadron's other predecessor, the 361st Reconnaissance Squadron was formed during the Vietnam War, flying Douglas EC-47 aircraft, performing electronic surveillance in Vietnam and Thailand until inactivating in 1974, when the United States withdrew from Southeast Asia.  The squadrons were consolidated in 1985, then converted to provisional status as an expeditionary unit.

History

World War II

Initial activation and training in the United States

The 861st Bombardment Squadron was first activated at McCook Army Air Field, Nebraska as one of the original four squadrons of the 493d Bombardment Group. The formation of the squadron was delayed by an administrative error that caused some of the unit's cadre to report to Davis-Monthan Field, Arizona instead of McCook. It was not until January that all personnel were at McCook. By this time, the squadron had transferred on paper to  Elveden Hall, England. The ground personnel of the squadron in the United States had been used to form Boeing B-29 Superfortress units being activated by Second Air Force, while the air echelon remained in Nebraska to conduct training on their assigned Consolidated B-24 Liberators. Meanwhile, Eighth Air Force formed a new ground echelon for the squadron in England from other units assigned to the 3d Bombardment Division. This ground echelon moved to the squadron's combat station, RAF Debach, in April 1944.

Combat in Europe

The squadron flew its first combat mission on D-Day, 6 June 1944.  It continued to fly Liberators until 24 August 1944, when it was withdrawn from combat to convert to Boeing B-17 Flying Fortresses, along with other groups of the 93d Bombardment Wing, as Eighth Air Force concentrated all its Liberators in the 2d Bombardment Division.  It resumed combat missions with the B-17 on 8 September 1944.  The squadron concentrated its attacks on military and industrial targets in Germany, attacking an ordnance depot in Magdeburg, factories near Frankfurt, and a synthetic oil manufacturing plant at Merseburg.  It also attacked lines of communications, including a railroad tunnel at Ahrweiler, bridges at Irlich, and marshalling yards near Cologne.

The squadron was occasionally diverted to attack tactical targets.  It supported Operation Overlord, the Normandy invasion, striking artillery batteries, airfields and bridges.  It struck enemy ground forces south of Caen and during Operation Cobra, the breakout at St Lo.  It bombed German fortifications to support Operation Market Garden, airborne attacks attempting to secure a bridgehead across the Rhine in the Netherlands and attacked communications during the Battle of the Bulge.  Toward the end of the war, it also supported Operation Varsity, the airborne assault across the Rhine in Germany.

The squadron flew its last combat mission against marshalling yards near Nauen on 20 April 1945, although it flew food-dropping missions in early May. In late August, the squadron assembled at Sioux Falls Army Air Field, South Dakota, where it was inactivated on 28 August 1945.

Vietnam War

The 361st Reconnaissance Squadron was activated at Nha Trang Air Base, South Vietnam in April 1966. It flew EC-47 aircraft equipped with electronic countermeasures equipment over South Vietnam. The squadron moved to Thailand in 1972 as part of the USAF drawdown in South Vietnam.  It continued missions over Indochina until 15 August 1973 when United States military flights over Indochina were halted by congressional mandate.    The squadron trained in Thailand until its inactivation on 30 June 1974.

Global War on Terror
The squadron reactivated as the 361st Expeditionary Reconnaissance Squadron as part of the Global War on Terrorism in 2003.  Assigned to the first the 407th Air Expeditionary Group, then later the 451st Air Expeditionary Group, the squadron operated a variety of Intelligence, Surveillance & Reconnaissance aircraft before the United States pullout from Iraq in 2011 and Afghanistan in 2014.

Lineage
 861st Bombardment Squadron
 Constituted as the 861st Bombardment Squadron (Heavy) on 14 September 1943
 Activated on 1 November 1943
 Redesignated 861st Bombardment Squadron, Heavy on 21 February 1944
 Inactivated on 28 August 1945
 Consolidated with the 361st Tactical Electronic Warfare Squadron as the 361st Tactical Electronic Warfare Squadron on 19 September 1985

 361st Reconnaissance Squadron
 Constituted as the 361st Reconnaissance Squadron and activated on 4 April 1966 (not organized)
 Organized on 8 April 1966
 Redesignated 361st Tactical Electronic Warfare Squadron on 15 March 1967
 Inactivated on 1 December 1971
 Activated on 1 September 1972
 Inactivated on 30 June 1974
 Consolidated with the 861st Bombardment Squadron on 19 September 1985
 Redesignated 361st Expeditionary Reconnaissance Squadron''' and converted to provisional status
 Activated c. December 2007
 Inactivated unknown
 Activated 1 May 2010
 Inactivated on 1 September 2014

Assignments
 493d Bombardment Group, 1 November 1943 – 28 August 1945
 Pacific Air Forces, 4 April 1966 (not organized)
 460th Tactical Reconnaissance Wing, 8 April 1966
 483d Tactical Airlift Wing, 31 August 1971 – 1 December 1971
 56th Special Operations Wing, 1 September 1972 – 30 June 1974
 Air Combat Command to activate or inactivate as needed
 407th Air Expeditionary Group, c. November 2007 – unknown
 451st Air Expeditionary Group, 20 May 2010 – 1 September 2014

Stations
 McCook Army Air Field, Nebraska, 1 November 1943 – 1 Jan 1944
 Elveden Hall (Station 116), England, 1 January 1944
 RAF Debach (Station 152), England, 17 April 1944 – 6 August 1945
 Sioux Falls Army Air Field, South Dakota, c. 13–28 August 1945
 Nha Trang Air Base, Republic of Vietnam, 8 April 1966
 Phù Cát Air Base, Republic of Vietnam, 1 September 1969 – 1 December 1971
 Nakhon Phanom Royal Thai Air Force Base, Thailand, 1 September 1972 – 30 June 1974
 Ali Air Base, Iraq, c. November 2007
 Kandahar Airfield, Afghanistan, 20 May 2010 – 1 September 2014

Aircraft

 Consolidated B-24 Liberator, 1943–1944
 Boeing B-17 Flying Fortress. 1944-1945
 Douglas C-47 Skytrain, 1967-1971, 1972-1974
 Douglas EC-47H Skytrain, 1967-1971, 1972-1974
 Beechcraft MC-12W Liberty, 2010-2014

Awards and campaigns

See also
 Baron 52

References

Notes
 Explanatory notes

 Citations

Bibliography

 
 
 
 
 
 
  
 

Reconnaissance squadrons of the United States Air Force